Shoa may refer to:

 The Holocaust, also known as "the Shoah" or Ha-Shoah in Hebrew
 Shewa, a region of Ethiopia, sometimes spelled Shoa
 Shoah (film), 1985 French documentary film about the Holocaust
 Amata shoa, a moth of the family Erebidae
 SHOA, Hydrographic and Oceanographic Service of the Chilean Navy

See also
 Shuwa Arabic, also known as the Chaddian Arabic dialect or referred to the Baggara Arabs